Pseudanisentomon huichouense is a species of proturan in the family Eosentomidae. It is endemic to Southern Asia.

References

Protura
Articles created by Qbugbot
Animals described in 1984